Lake Poinsett is a lake in Brevard County, Florida, United States, near Rockledge and Cocoa, with small portions in Orange County and Osceola County. It is the second-largest lake in Brevard County, after Lake Washington, though it is actually the smallest lake in Osceola County. At the eastern portion of the lake, a channel connects the lake to Lake Florence and Barnett Lake.

Lake Poinsett and all the other lakes flow northward as part of the St. Johns River system.

It is where the Saint Johns River runs along county lines north of the lake. It is part of the St. Johns River Water Management District. At the extreme northwest corner of Lake Poinsett is Taylor Creek, a tributary of the St. Johns River.

The lake is named for Joel Roberts Poinsett, a diplomat who brought the poinsettia to the United States.

Nearby places and roads 
County Road 532
State Road 520
Interstate 95
Tucker Lane
Cocoa West
Cocoa
Rockledge
Canaveral Groves
Lake Poinsett Road
Providence Ave.
 Bird Island
 Robin Island Amber Lane
 Angler Drive

Poinsett Shores 
Poinsett Shores & Poinsett Acres are a boating community located on the northeastern side of Lake Poinsett, at the southern end of former State Road 520A (Lake Poinsett Road). It is one of two communities that surround Lake Poinsett, the other being WoodMoore Estates on the east-northeastern shore. The community is about one and a half square miles.

History
250,000 fish were killed in July 2002, when a heavy rainstorm washed in phosphorus-rich runoff from lawns in the area as well as from septic tanks.

See also 
St. Johns River
Lake Washington
Ruth Lake: next lake downriver
Lake Winder: next lake upriver

Notes

Poinsett
Poinsett
Poinsett
St. Johns River
Poinsett